Ven. Uduwe Dhammaloka Thero, a popular Buddhist monk in Sri Lanka. He rose to fame from his weekly sermon programmes (bana) on TV. A critic of the government system in Sri Lanka he joined the Jathika Hela Urumaya (National Heritage Party) with a group of monks to contest the local elections in 2004 and was elected as a member of Parliament.

References 

Sri Lankan Buddhist monks
Year of birth missing (living people)
Living people
Jathika Hela Urumaya politicians
Members of the 13th Parliament of Sri Lanka
Sinhalese politicians
21st-century Buddhist monks